T100 or T-100 may refer to:

 T100, former train number of Shanghai-Kowloon Through Train
 T-100 tank, Soviet super-heavy tank prototype 
 Toyota T100, a pickup truck, produced by Toyota between 1992 and 1998, for North American markets
 Triumph Bonneville T100, a motorcycle
 Leonardo DRS T-100 Integrated Training System, an advanced trainer based on the Alenia Aermacchi M-346 Master

See also
 T1000 (disambiguation)